Grey man, The Gray Man or The Grey Man may refer to:

Concepts 
 Grey man theory, a concept in everyday carry that one should blend in with the environment so as not to raise suspicion

People
 The primary nickname of American serial killer Albert Fish
 A nickname of British Prime Minister John Major, known as the "grey man" of British politics

Legendary or alleged people or entities
 The Gray Man (ghost), a historical ghost of Pawleys Island
 The Grey Man of Scottish folklore, also named Fear liath
 Grey alien, an alleged race of extraterrestrials

Fictional characters
 The Gray Man (The Hardy Boys), a character from the book series
 Gray Man, a creature in the Wheel of Time novels
 Gray Man (comics), a DC Comics mystical supervillain

Film, television, and literature titles
 The Gray Man (2007 film), a biographical thriller starring Patrick Bauchau
 The Gray Man (2022 film), an American film based on the 2009 Mark Greaney novel
 D.Gray-man, a 2004 manga and anime series
 The Gray Man (novel series), a series of spy novels by Mark Greaney (novelist)
 The Gray Man (novel), a 2009 novel by Mark Greaney, first in the series of novels
 "The Grey Man", an episode of NCIS: Los Angeles
 "The Gray Man" (short story), a short story by Bob Shaw
 The Gray Man (2002 film), an action film co-starring Angelo Fierro
 a passage from a serial version of H.G. Wells' The Time Machine which was deleted from the book version was later published under the title "The Grey Man"

See also

Gray (disambiguation)
Grey (disambiguation)
Man (disambiguation)